Saint Martins is a village in  Saint Philip Parish in Barbados. It is a 5 minutes drive east of Sir Grantly Adams International Airports. Nearby villages include Rockhall, Gemswick, FoulBay, and Kirtons.

Populated places in Barbados